The Terzerol (or terzerole) was a small muzzle-loading pistol with one or two barrels.  These firearms were used from the 17th century onward, first as flintlocks, and in the 19th century with percussion caps.  

Due to its size, the weapon was also called a "pocket pistol" or "lady's pistol", in contrast with the more common large handguns of the era.  The term terzerol is derived from Italian.

References 

Pistols
17th-century weapons
18th-century weapons
19th-century weapons